Oscar Macias Hernández  (born February 1, 1969) is a Cuban baseball player and Olympic silver medalist.

External links
Olympic Info
 

1969 births
Living people
Vaqueros de la Habana players
Olympic baseball players of Cuba
Baseball players at the 2000 Summer Olympics
Olympic silver medalists for Cuba
Olympic medalists in baseball

Medalists at the 2000 Summer Olympics
Central American and Caribbean Games gold medalists for Cuba
Competitors at the 1998 Central American and Caribbean Games
Central American and Caribbean Games medalists in baseball
20th-century Cuban people